Mattia Perin (born 10 November 1992) is an Italian professional footballer who plays as a goalkeeper for  club Juventus. He also represented the Italy national team.

He began his career with Genoa in 2010, and, aside from two season-long loan spells with Padova in 2011–12, and Pescara in 2012–13, he then remained there until the summer of 2018, during which he was sold to Juventus. He won the league title with the club during the 2018–19 season, although he primarily served as a back-up. At international level, he was an unused member of the Italy national team that took part at the 2014 FIFA World Cup, and made his senior debut later that year.

Club career

Genoa
Born in Latina and a product of the Genoa youth system, Perin was promoted to first team squad in January 2010, as a third-choice goalkeeper, and received the 88 jersey. He appeared on the bench in the matches against Grosseto (20 October 2010), Vicenza (24 November), Inter (12 January 2011) and Lazio (14 May). He made his professional and Serie A debut on 22 May 2011, playing as a starter in the 3–2 home victory against Cesena.

In July 2011, he was loaned to Serie B club Padova. He made his Serie B debut on 1 October 2011, playing as a starter in the away match won 4–2 against Empoli.

In the 2012 summer, he was loaned to Pescara, newly promoted in Serie A, obtaining 29 league appearances at the end of the season.

On 8 January 2017, Perin tore the anterior cruciate ligament in his right knee in a 1–0 home defeat to Roma, ruling him out for the remainder of the 2016–17 season.

Juventus

On 8 June 2018, Perin signed for Juventus on a four-year contract for a fee of €12 million plus €3 million in bonuses; he was initially expected to compete with Wojciech Szczęsny for a starting spot, following the departure of Gianluigi Buffon. Perin made his Juventus debut on 26 September 2018, keeping a clean sheet in a 2–0 home win over Bologna. On 1 April 2019, he injured the right shoulder. He only made a total of nine competitive appearances for the club throughout the season, all of which came in Serie A, as Juventus finished the season as league champions.

In July, Perin was linked with a move to Portuguese side Benfica; however, he failed his medical, due to a shoulder injury, and the transfer was not completed. Due to the return of Buffon as a back-up to Szczęsny, Perin was relegated to the role of the club's fourth goalkeeper, behind Carlo Pinsoglio; as such, in September, he was subsequently excluded from Juventus's 22–player Champions League squad by manager Maurizio Sarri.

On 2 January 2020, he rejoined Genoa on loan until the end of the 2019–20 season. He made his first appearance since his return three days later, in a 2–1 home win over Sassuolo in Serie A. On 5 September 2020, he rejoined Genoa on loan until the end of the 2020–21 season. 

In the summer of 2021, Perin returned to Juventus as a back-up to Szczęsny. He made his debut from his return on 26 September, in a 3–2 win against Sampdoria in Serie A. On 8 December, he made his UEFA Club Competition and UEFA Champions League debut in a 1–0 home win over Malmö in Juventus's final first-round match of the latter competition, which saw them top their group. On 14 April 2022, Juventus announced his contract had been extended until 2025.

International career

Youth teams

With the Italy U17 he played as the first choice keeper in both the 2009 European U17 Championship, and the 2009 FIFA U-17 World Cup held in Nigeria.

As a member of the Italy U19 team he took part as the backup goalkeeper at the 2010 European U19 Championship.

He made his debut for the Italy U21 team on 11 August 2010, aged only 17, in a friendly match against Denmark.

In 2011–12 season Perin played once for Italy under-21 Serie B representative team and twice for Italy national under-20 football team, both feeder teams of U21.

Senior team
Perin received his first call up for the Italian senior team by head coach Cesare Prandelli, for the friendly match against England held on 15 August 2012 in Bern; seven other new faces were in the squad. He was included in Prandelli's provisional 30-man squad ahead of 2014 FIFA World Cup in Brazil, and then confirmed in the 23-man squad as the third choice goalkeeper behind Gianluigi Buffon and Salvatore Sirigu. He became the youngest player of the squad and the only one who had no previous caps.

He made his debut with the national team on 18 November 2014, in a 1–0 friendly win against Albania, replacing Sirigu for the last 17 minutes at his club ground of the Stadio Luigi Ferraris. On 9 April 2016, he suffered an injury with Genoa in which he tore his anterior cruciate ligament and damaged his meniscus in his right knee, which would cause his absence as Italy's third goalkeeper at the UEFA Euro 2016.

Perin made his first start on his second cap on 4 June 2018, a 1–1 friendly draw against the Netherlands in Turin.

Style of play
Considered one of the most promising young Italian players of his generation in his position, Perin is an agile, athletic, and dynamic keeper, who is highly regarded for his excellent reactions, shot-stopping ability, positional sense, bravery, and consistency; possessing good technique, he is gifted with strong all-round fundamental goalkeeping skills, and is also known for his speed to get to ground and ability to come off his line to collect the ball. Due to his attributes, movements, and playing style, he has been compared to Walter Zenga. In spite of his talent, however, he has struggled with injuries on occasion.

Controversy
Perin had several run-ins with fans of Frosinone, the local rivals of his hometown of Latina. In May 2016, during an Instagram argument with a fan of the latter team, he wrote "your grandfather speaks Arabic", in reference to the Marocchinate atrocities in the region in 1944. The insult was condemned in the Italian Senate by the city's senator Maria Spilabotte. In September 2018, Juventus manager Massimiliano Allegri benched Perin for the club's game away to Frosinone.

Career statistics

Club

International

Honours

Club 
Juventus
 Serie A: 2018–19
 Supercoppa Italiana: 2018

Individual 
 UEFA European Under-17 Championship Team of the tournament: 2009

References

External links

Profile at the Juventus F.C. website
 
 Career summary by aic.football.it  
 Career summary by legaseriea.it
 
 

1992 births
Living people
People from Latina, Lazio
Italian footballers
Association football goalkeepers
Serie A players
Serie B players
Genoa C.F.C. players
Calcio Padova players
Delfino Pescara 1936 players
Juventus F.C. players
Italy youth international footballers
Italy under-21 international footballers
2014 FIFA World Cup players
Italy international footballers
Footballers from Lazio
Sportspeople from the Province of Latina